A dropping funnel is a type of laboratory glassware used to transfer fluids. They are fitted with a stopcock which allows the flow to be controlled. Dropping funnels are useful for adding reagents slowly, i.e. drop-wise. This may be desirable when the quick addition of the reagent may result in side reactions, or if the reaction is too vigorous.

Dropping funnels are usually fitted with a ground glass joint which allows the funnel to fit snugly onto, e.g. a round bottom flask. This also means it need not be clamped separately.

Types

 cylindrical type graduated and ungraduated with cone and socket
 with pressure equalizing tube
 pear shaped, graduated and ungraduated
Pressure-equalizing dropping funnels have an additional narrow-bore glass tube from the bulb of the funnel, to the ground glass joint around the stem. These replace the liquid volume lost in the bulb with the equivalent gas volume from the flask into which the reagent is flowing, and are useful when handling air-sensitive reagents in a sealed, inert-gas environment. Without this tube, or some other means to equalize the pressure between a sealed receiving flask and the bulb of the funnel, the flow of fluid from the bulb will rapidly come to a halt.

See also
 Separatory funnels are similar in shape and design, and may be used as dropping funnels. They do not always have the ground glass joint at the stem, instead having a narrow tube suitable for insertion into a rubber stopper.

Laboratory glassware